Saint Tatiana was a Christian martyr in 3rd-century Rome during the reign of Emperor Severus Alexander.

Biography 
According to legend, she was the daughter of a Roman civil servant who was secretly Christian, and raised his daughter in the faith. This was dangerous, and one day the jurist Ulpian captured Tatiana and attempted to force her to make a sacrifice to Apollo. She prayed, and miraculously, an earthquake destroyed the Apollo statue and part of the temple.

Tatiana was then blinded, and beaten for two days, before being brought to a circus and thrown into the pit with a hungry lion. But the lion did not touch her and lay at her feet. She was then sentenced to death, and after being tortured, Tatiana was beheaded with a sword on January 12, around AD 225 or 230.

Veneration

Tatiana is venerated as a saint, and her feast day is on January 12 (for those churches which follow the traditional Julian Calendar, January 12 currently falls on January 25 of the modern Gregorian Calendar). The miracles performed by Saint Tatiana are said to have converted many people to the fledgling religion. Her skull was translated in 1955 from Bistrița Monastery to the Cathedral of Saint Demetrius in Craiova, Romania, and is enshrined with the relics of Saints Sergius and Bacchus and those of Patriach Nephon II of Constantinople. 

Saint Tatiana is patron saint of students. In Russia and Belarus, Tatiana Day is semi-formally celebrated as "Students' Day."

The similarity of her life with those of Martina and Prisca has led some to question whether they may even all be the same person, or if perhaps similar hagiographies were assigned to them posthumously. There is no early evidence of veneration of either Martina or Tatiana in Rome, and Prisca (or Priscilla) is hard to identify.

References
Attwater, Donald and Catherine Rachel John. The Penguin Dictionary of Saints. 3rd edition. New York: Penguin Books, 1993. .

External links 
Martyrdom of Saint Tatiana (includes icon)
Martyr Tatiana of Rome, and those who suffered with Her Orthodox icon and synaxarion
The Holy Female Martyr Tatiana Prologue from Ochrid

Year of birth unknown
Ante-Nicene Christian female saints
Italian saints
3rd-century Christian martyrs
Christian martyrs executed by decapitation
226 deaths